Erwin Scharf may refer to:

 Erwin Scharf (art director) (1901–1972), Austrian art director
 Erwin Scharf (politician) (1914-1994),  Austrian politician